William Heyworth (died 1447)  was a medieval Bishop of Coventry and Lichfield.

Heyworth was nominated on 20 November 1419, and consecrated on 28 July 1420. He died between 15 March and 24 March 1447.

Citations

References

 

15th-century English Roman Catholic bishops
Bishops of Lichfield
1447 deaths
Year of birth unknown